Westboro is an unincorporated community in Jefferson Township, Clinton County, Ohio, United States.

History
Westboro was platted in 1838. The community may derive its name from nearby West Fork Creek.  A post office was established at Westboro in 1847, and remained in operation until 1971.

Gallery

References

Unincorporated communities in Clinton County, Ohio
Unincorporated communities in Ohio